"Clones" is the first single released from the Meltdown album by the band Ash on . The track came with a free artwork and a video when downloading.

Songwriter Tim Wheeler has talked about the song on various occasions, and described it as:
"It's about how homogenized mankind has become. People don't really stand out. It's a rant about some person who's let you down, a person you thought was different and they turn out to be the same as everyone else."

"It's about someone you've idealised - a politician, a band, anything you've believed in that's really let you down. You thought they were unique and special but they've just turned out to be the same."

"I had to step away from myself, write about the wider world for a change. The social commentary songs, like 'Clones' are there because I'm ready now to address what I feel about politics."

The song was played constantly on the accompanying Meltdown tours, and appears on the live Meltdown special edition bonus disc, but has since been rested thus far on the 2007 Higher Education Tour. The song was used on the soundtrack for the game Star Wars: Republic Commando and the song later appeared on the accompanying Commando EP.

Music video 
There are two videos for "Clones". The first one was directed by Jeff Thomas and stars Ash playing the song in a warehouse, and Wheeler meeting a cloned version of himself at the end of the video. Mark Hamilton, the bassist for Ash, has said of the video: "This is a straight up performance video. Dark and gritty it was shot in a warehouse in the East End, London. It was a cold winter morning, there was no heating and we got drenched by a guy with a hose between takes. Thanks Jeff!"

The second video was also directed by Jeff Thomas. The video was re-filmed in conjunction with the release of the "Commando" EP in the USA. The director has said of it: "(It's an) Ash live performance taken from the original UK video and intercut with video game footage from LucasArts's Star Wars: Republic Commando. We got asked to provide music for the game during the Meltdown writing period and by complete fluke had just demoed the 'Clones' track!"

Track listing 
Download single
"Clones" (Wheeler)
"Clones (Video)" (Wheeler)

References

2004 songs
2004 singles
Ash (band) songs
Republic Commando
Songs written by Tim Wheeler
Song recordings produced by Nick Raskulinecz
Infectious Records singles